The Valea Mare is a right tributary of the river Netezi in Romania. It flows into the Netezi in Grumăzești.

References

Rivers of Romania
Rivers of Neamț County